FC Zirka-2 Kropyvnytskyi was a Ukrainian football team based in Kropyvnytskyi, Ukraine. The club has been featured regularly in the Ukrainian Second Division it serves as a junior team for the FC Zirka Kropyvnytskyi franchise. Like most tributary teams, the best players are sent up to the senior team, meanwhile developing other players for further call-ups.

FC Zirka Kropyvnytskyi
Defunct football clubs in Ukraine
Ukrainian reserve football teams
Association football clubs established in 1997
Association football clubs disestablished in 2000
1997 establishments in Ukraine
2000 disestablishments in Ukraine